Ludmila Lida Bášová also known as Ludmila Šimáková (born 23 April 1968) is a former Czech female badminton player who has represented both Czechoslovakia and Czech Republic in international badminton competitions. She has participated in several European Championships, World Championships in from 1991 to 2000.

She won the Czechoslovak National Badminton Championships women's doubles title along with Alena Horáková in 1992, which was her first national Championship title win in her badminton career. She played for Czechoslovakia from 1991-1993 until the  dissolution of Czechoslovakia with the birth name Ludmila Šimáková. She was married to Petr Báša in 1993 with the name Ludmila Bášová. Ludmila Bášová went onto represent Czech Republic in badminton competitions from 1993-2000 which became an independent nation after the dissolution of the Czechoslovakia. Ludmila won women's doubles titles on 4 consecutive occasions at the Czech National Badminton Championships from 1997 to 2000 partnering with Markéta Koudelková before her retirement from playing badminton. Her daughter Alžběta Bášová is also a professional badminton player represents Czech Republic at the international badminton Championships.

References

External links 

Badminton player at PDF

1968 births
Living people
Czech female badminton players
Sportspeople from Hradec Králové